Northern Mountain Range may refer to:

Albania: Northern Mountain Range (Albania)
Dominican Republic: Cordillera Septentrional
India: Himalayas
Serbia: Valjevo mountains or Serbian Carpathians
U.S.A.: Alaskan mountain ranges

They are a series of gigantic mountain ranges
There are three specific mountain ranges- they are The Himalayas, The Ladakh and The Karakoram